Sean Michael Baldock (born 3 December 1976) is a male British former sprinter who competed in the 2000 Summer Olympics and in the 2004 Summer Olympics.

Athletics career
He was born in Hastings, East Sussex. He only became a serious athlete in 1996 having joined Hastings Athletic Club as an under-11 athlete in 1987. Prior to that he had played football, eventually playing for Hastings Town. When he reached 18, because he was always getting injured, he was forced to make a choice between football and athletics, world class athlete.

He represented England and won a silver medal in the 4 x 400 metres event, at the 1998 Commonwealth Games in Kuala Lumpur, Malaysia. The other team members consisted of Solomon Wariso, Mark Richardson, Jared Deacon, Paul Slythe and Mark Hylton. Four years later at the 2002 Commonwealth Games in Manchester he was part of the gold medal-winning team in the 4 x 400 metres relay that consisted of Chris Rawlinson, Cori Henry, Daniel Caines, Hylton and Deacon.

Personal life
Upon retirement, he became a sports teacher at Claremont School, East Sussex, a lecturer on sports injury at Sussex Coast College and a retained firefighter. More recently, he was a sports coach at Buckswood School East Sussex.

Competition record

Personal Bests

References

External links
 

1976 births
Living people
British male sprinters
English male sprinters
Olympic athletes of Great Britain
Athletes (track and field) at the 2000 Summer Olympics
Athletes (track and field) at the 2004 Summer Olympics
World Athletics Championships athletes for Great Britain
Commonwealth Games medallists in athletics
Athletes (track and field) at the 2002 Commonwealth Games
Athletes (track and field) at the 1998 Commonwealth Games
Sportspeople from Hastings
European Athletics Championships medalists
Commonwealth Games gold medallists for England
Commonwealth Games silver medallists for England
Universiade medalists in athletics (track and field)
Universiade bronze medalists for Great Britain
World Athletics Indoor Championships medalists
Medalists at the 1997 Summer Universiade
Medallists at the 1998 Commonwealth Games
Medallists at the 2002 Commonwealth Games